Laland is a surname. Notable people with this surname include:

Kevin Laland (born 1962), English evolutionary biologist
Søren Laland (1922–1998), Norwegian biochemist

See also
Lalande (disambiguation)

Norwegian-language surnames